Chiswick Park Footbridge is a pedestrian bridge north of Gunnersbury Triangle Nature Reserve in Chiswick, London that connects Chiswick Business Park with Chiswick Park tube station.

Construction

The bridge was designed by London-based companies Expedition Engineering and Useful Studios. It has three spans of Corten steel, which weathers to a rust-orange colour, requiring no painting. The walking surface is made of hardwood, and the balustrade is of stainless steel. It was constructed by Lendlease and cost seven million pounds. It opened on 24 January 2019. The bridge won in the best infrastructure category in the 2019 AJ Architecture Awards.

References

External links

Pedestrian bridges in London
Bridges completed in 2019
Buildings and structures in Chiswick
2019 establishments in England